"Voices" is a song by English musical duo Hurts from their fifth studio album, Faith (2020). It was released on 15 May 2020 as the lead single from the album, along with an accompanying lyric video in which the band performed the song in a glass box, under strobe lighting. The duo wrote the song along with Martin Forslund and Dave Gibson, while the production was taken by Forslund and Hurts themselves.

Credits and personnel
 Theo Hutchcraft – songwriting, production, vocals
 Adam Anderson – songwriting, production
 Martin Forslund – songwriting
 Dave Gibson - songwriting
 Matty Green – mixing engineer

Charts

Release history

References

2020 singles
2020 songs
Hurts songs
Songs written by Theo Hutchcraft
Songs written by Dave Gibson (Scottish singer-songwriter)